Fazekas is a Hungarian language surname meaning potter.  Notable people with the surname include:

Franz Fazekas (born 1956), Austrian neurologist
István Fazekas (1898–1967), Hungarian–British chess master
Krisztina Fazekas (born 1980), Hungarian sprint canoeist who has competed since the mid-2000s
László Fazekas (born 1947), Hungarian football player
Mihály Fazekas (1766–1828), Hungarian writer from Debrecen
Nándor Fazekas (born 1976), Hungarian handball goalkeeper
Nick Fazekas (born 1985), American professional basketball player
Róbert Fazekas (born 1975), Hungarian discus thrower who won gold in the 2002 European Championships
Sándor Fazekas (born 1963), Hungarian jurist and politician
Stephen Fazekas de St. Groth, Hungarian-Australia microbiologist
Tibor Fazekas (1892–1982), Hungarian water polo player who competed in the 1912 and 1924 Summer Olympics

See also 
Fazekas Hills
Fazekas Mihály Gimnázium (Budapest), a high school in Budapest, Hungary
Fazekas Mihály Gimnázium (Debrecen) a high school in Debrecen, Hungary

Hungarian-language surnames

Occupational surnames